Calvin D'Wayne Jones (born November 27, 1970) is a former American football running back. He played for the Los Angeles/Oakland Raiders and the Green Bay Packers. In his only season with the Packers, he won Super Bowl XXXI against the New England Patriots. He collegiately played for Nebraska Cornhuskers in the NCAA.

In the NFL, Calvin Jones played with the Raiders for two years.  He ran for 112 yards on 27 carries in 2 seasons.  He spent his final season with Green Bay.

Jones rushed for 3,166 yards and scored 40 rushing touchdowns from 1990–1993 for the University of Nebraska.  He played I-back under the direction of head coach Dr. Tom Osborne.  Jones' single season high was 1,210 rushing yards in 1992.

His best single game performance came as a redshirt freshman on November 9, 1991 against Kansas when Jones ran the ball 27 times for 294 yards and scored on a 69-yard touchdown run.   He had six touchdowns that day.

In 1991, Jones led the nation with an incredible 8.3 yards per carry.

Jones played with the Omaha Beef in 2000.

Statistics

References

1970 births
Living people
Sportspeople from Omaha, Nebraska
American football running backs
Nebraska Cornhuskers football players
Los Angeles Raiders players
Oakland Raiders players
Green Bay Packers players
Omaha Beef players
Omaha Central High School alumni